The Mrima Hill mine is a large niobium mine located in southern Kenya in the Coast Province, close to Mombasa. Mrima Hill represents one of the largest niobium reserves in Kenya, having estimated reserves of 105.3 million tonnes of ore grading 0.65% niobium metal.

References 

Niobium mines in Kenya